Rhyacionia frustrana, the Nantucket pine tip moth, is a moth of the family Tortricidae. It is found in the United States from Massachusetts south to Florida, west to Missouri, Oklahoma, Texas and California. It is also found in the Dominican Republic, Cuba, Jamaica, Mexico (Oaxaca), Guatemala, Honduras and Nicaragua.

The wingspan is about 11 mm. Adults emerge in early spring, at times as early as February in Florida. There are four to five generations per year in Florida.

Larvae feed on various pine species, including Pinus caribaea, Pinus cubensis, Pinus banksiana, Pinus taeda, Pinus contorta, Pinus radiata, Pinus oocarpa, Pinus rigida, Pinus serotina, Pinus ponderosa, Pinus resinosa, Pinus clausa, Pinus sylvestris, Pinus echinata, Pinus elliottii, Pinus glabra, Pinus pungens and Pinus virginiana. It is considered a serious pest of young pine in plantations, wild pine seedlings in open areas, Christmas tree plantings, ornamental pines, and pine seed orchards. Young larvae feed on the outside of new growth for a short period of time and later bore into shoot tips, conelets and buds. Larval feeding continues for three to four weeks. Pupation occurs in damaged tissues.

Gallery

External links
 Bug Guide
 Images
 Species info

Olethreutinae
Moths of North America
Moths described in 1880
Agricultural pest insects